Vernonia anandrioides is a species of perennial plant in the family Asteraceae. It is endemic to Angola.

References 

anandrioides

Flora of Angola